Events in the year 1155 in Norway.

Incumbents
 Monarchs – Sigurd II Haraldsson, Eystein II Haraldsson and Inge I Haraldsson

Events
 King Sigurd II of Norway was killed in Bergen by the men of his brother and co-ruler Inge I Haraldsson.

Births

Deaths
10 June – Sigurd II Haraldsson, King of Norway from 1136 to 1155 (born 1133).

References

Norway